{{DISPLAYTITLE:C9H11N}}
The molecular formula C9H11N may refer to:

 2-Aminoindane, an amphetamine analog
 Tetrahydroisoquinoline, a heterocyclic compound that forms the core of some alkaloids
 Tetrahydroquinoline
 Tranylcypromine, an antidepressant